Zhongnanhai is a former imperial garden in the Imperial City, Beijing, adjacent to the Forbidden City; it serves as the central headquarters for the Chinese Communist Party (CCP) and the State Council (central government) of China. Zhongnanhai houses the offices of and serves as the residence for the leadership of the party and state. The term Zhongnanhai is closely linked with the central government and senior CCP officials, and is often used as a metonym for the Chinese leadership at large.

The state leaders, including Xi Jinping, current general secretary of the CCP, and other top CCP and PRC leadership figures carry out many of their day-to-day administrative activities inside the compound, such as meetings with foreign dignitaries. China Central Television (CCTV) frequently shows footage of meetings inside the compound, but limits its coverage largely to views of the interior of buildings. Though numerous maps of the complex exist from before the founding of the People's Republic of China, the interior layout of Zhongnanhai has been altered significantly since then, including a wave of major renovations in the 1970s. Today many buildings share the names of older, pre-PRC structures, but have completely changed in layout and purpose. The complex is divided into two main sections, reflecting the parallel authority of the highest level of state and party institutions in the country. North Zhongnanhai is used as the headquarters of the State Council and includes the offices of its senior most leaders as well as its principal meeting rooms. South Zhongnanhai is the headquarters of the CCP Central Committee, including its staff and its highest level coordinating institutions, such as the Standing Committee, Politburo and Secretariat.

The current basic outline of Zhongnanhai emerged during the Ming dynasty when the southernmost of the two lakes in the complex was created in 1421. By the late Qing Dynasty, Zhongnanhai was used as the de facto center of government, with Empress Dowager Cixi and later Prince Regent Chun building residences there instead of the Forbidden City. After the establishment of the Republic of China, the new president, Yuan Shikai remodeled Zhongnanhai to become the formal center of what would become known as the Beiyang Government. In 1949, CCP Chairman Mao Zedong moved into the complex after the establishment of the People's Republic of China. Mao received many important foreign leaders in Zhongnanhai, including Nikita Khrushchev, Che Guevara, Richard Nixon, Georges Pompidou, Kakuei Tanaka and Zulfikar Ali Bhutto, among others. Mao's favorite places in Zhongnanhai were the Library of Chrysanthemum Fragrance (his personal residence, filled with bookshelves) and the Poolside House, next to the large indoor swimming pool, where he would spend much of the day swimming or reading books and reports by the pool. After Mao's death, the Chrysanthemum Library along with many of his belongings was preserved as a museum which is not accessible to the general public.

Location

The name of the Zhongnanhai complex, located west of the Forbidden City, means "central and southern seas/lakes", referring to two lakes (the "Central Sea" (中海) and "Southern Sea" (南海)) located within the compound; it is sometimes translated as "Sea Palaces". These two lakes are part of a series of projects carried out during the construction of the nearby Forbidden City. Also part of the same system is the "Northern Sea", or "Beihai" (北海), now a public park. The Northern, Central and Southern Seas are jointly called the  Taiye Lake (太液池); the Shichahai (什剎海) is connected to Beihai at the north.

The Taiye Lake was originally an imperial garden called Xiyuan (Western Park, 西苑) or Xinei (Western Court), with parklands on the shores, enclosed by a red wall in the western part of the Imperial City, Beijing. Most of the pavilions, shrines, and temples survive from this period. Whereas the Northern sea had a religious focus, the shores of Central and Southern seas were dotted with a number of palaces.

History

During the Jin dynasty (1115–1235), the Emperor Zhangzong of Jin built the northern lake in 1189. The northern section of Zhongnanhai was the Taiye Lake, with an attached palace called the "Palace of Great Peace" (Daninggong). During the Yuan Dynasty, which lasted from 1271 to 1368, Taiye Lake was included within the Imperial City. It was also expanded, covering approximately the area occupied by the Northern and Central Seas today. Three palaces were built around the lake.

After the Ming dynasty moved its capital to Beijing in 1403 by order of the Yongle Emperor, construction on the existing Imperial Palace began in 1406. The Ming palace was to the south of the Yuan dynastic palace. As a result, a new Southern Sea was dug to the south of the old lake. The excavated soil, together with that from construction of the moat, was piled up to form Jingshan, a hill to the north of the Forbidden City. At this time, the three lakes were connected and were collectively called the Taiye Lake. The three lakes were divided by bridges. The lakes were part of an extensive royal park called Xiyuan (Western Garden) to the west of the Imperial Palace. In the middle Ming dynasty, Zhengde Emperor and Jiajing Emperor built many palaces, Taoist temples and pavilions around the lakes and spent more time here rather than the Forbidden City.

After the Qing dynasty established its capital in Beijing, the government reduced the size of the royal park to the area centered around the three lakes and enclosed by a small wall. Several successive emperors built pavilions and houses along the lakeshores, where they would carry out government duties in the summer. During the reign of the Empress Dowager Cixi, both the Empress Dowager and the Emperor would often live in the Zhongnanhai compound, traveling to the Forbidden City only for ceremonial duties.

During the Boxer Rebellion of 1899–1901, Russian troops occupied Zhongnanhai. Almost all artifacts and decorations in the compound were looted. Later, the Eight-Nation Alliance commander also lived in Zhongnanhai. When Puyi was crowned Emperor, his father as the Prince Regent lived for a short time in the compound.

Zhongnanhai continued to be politically significant during the Republic of China era, when the Beiyang Government under Yuan Shikai, placed its presidential palace in the Zhongnanhai compound from 1911. This decision was made because the regime wished to house its government close to the historical center of power, the Forbidden City, even though it could not use the Forbidden City itself because the abdicated Emperor Puyi still lived there. The current main gate, Xinhua Gate or "Gate of New China", was created by Yuan Shikai. The present "gatehouse" was previously a pavilion located on the southern shore the Southern Sea, close to the southern wall. Entry to the compound was instead directly from the Forbidden City. Yuan wished to create a new entrance from Chang'an Avenue, independent of the Forbidden City. Thus the pavilion was modified to become a gatehouse, with nearby walls cut back, resulting in the angled walls near the entrance today. Yuan renamed Zhongnanhai Xinhua Palace ("Palace of New China") during his brief reign as Emperor of China. When the Republic of China government moved its capital to Nanjing, the Zhongnanhai compound was opened to the public as a park.

After the CCP's Capture of Beijing in 1949, the party's senior leadership began plans to relocate their headquarters to the old capital, but they did not initially agree on the location of their central workplace. Mao Zedong and the other party leaders initially made their headquarters at Xiangshan Park, in the city's suburbs. As part of the planning for the first Chinese People's Political Consultative Conference Zhou Enlai decided that Hauiren Hall in Zhongnanhai would be ideal, but he did not initially recommend it during meetings at the party headquarters. In these early months, Zhou would commute into Beijing for work. However, because of the poor quality of the roads, he would often stay at Zhongnanhai instead of traveling home in the evening. It was Ye Jianying, the interim administrator of Beijing, who ultimately recommended Zhongnanhai as the party headquarters for security reasons. Mao Zedong initially refused to move into Zhongnanhai, not wanting to be equated with an emperor. Zhou Enlai nonetheless agreed to the move, as did the majority of the Politburo. Since then, Zhongnanhai has served as the principal center of government in the People's Republic of China.

The People's Republic government built many of the structures that are visible today in the compound. The compound itself housed the CCP Central Committee, as well as the State Council. Early leaders, such as Mao Zedong, Zhou Enlai, and Deng Xiaoping lived in the compound.

In contemporary times 

Since Zhongnanhai became the central government compound, it has been mostly inaccessible to the general public. The exception to this was during the years of relative freedom following the end of the Cultural Revolution, when the compound was open to members of the public, who could obtain tickets to visit the compound from relevant government authorities. Following the political turmoil that culminated in the 1989 Tiananmen Square protests and massacre, security was greatly increased. Access has now been closed to the general public, with numerous plain clothed military personnel patrolling the area on foot. However, cars are not strictly prohibited from stopping on stretches of adjacent roadway and cabs are allowed to stop except during important conferences or events. Chinese maps of Beijing show Zhongnanhai as an insignificant green area with a water body; in contrast, the municipal government, however, is shown significantly with a red star.

The most important entrance to the compound is the southern one at Xinhuamen (Xinhua Gate, or "Gate of New China"), surrounded by two slogans: "long live the great Chinese Communist Party" and "long live the invincible Mao Zedong Thought." The view behind the entrance is shielded by a traditional screen wall with the slogan "Serve the People", written in the handwriting of Mao Zedong. The Xinhuamen entrance lies on the north side of West Chang'an Avenue.

Zhongnanhai is considered the de jure residence of the CCP Politburo Standing Committee members and other senior leaders for electoral purposes. Though it serves as their formal residence, many senior party leaders do not actually live in Zhongnnanhai, preferring to live in homes elsewhere in the city. Several more recent leaders, such as then General Secretary and paramount leader Hu Jintao reportedly chose to live in the Jade Spring Hill compound in western Beijing due to overcrowding inside Zhongnanhai. China's current leader Xi Jinping also has a home in Jade Spring Hill. There continues to be no standardized system for awarding certain houses to leaders of a certain rank in Zhongnanhai. After a senior leader's death, their spouse is often permitted to stay in the house indefinitely. Several of these houses were occupied by the families of their original post-revolution residents into the 1990s.

Internal layout

Zhonghai 
Zhonghai (literally "Middle Sea") is the headquarters of the State Council of the People's Republic of China and its affiliate institutions, including the offices of the Premier and the Vice Premiers as well as the State Council General Office. Important guests, both foreign and domestic, are typically received in North Zhongnanhai.

Regent Palace 
() The original Regent Palace was a large Siheyuan style mansion that took up most of the north-western corner of Zhongnanhai. Though most of the building no longer exists, it is now the site of the principal meeting areas and offices of the State Council. The former main entrance and upper hall of Regent Palace are currently the location of the State Council's conference rooms. Altogether, the State Council possesses a total of six meeting rooms which are used for various purposes. Both the full State Council and the weekly meetings of the State Council Standing Committee meet in Conference Room Number One. There is a thirty-meter corridor in front of Conference Room Number One which has space for exhibits and displays including one related to science and technology that was in existence circa 2017. This corridor also leads into Conference Room Number Two. The State Council Research Office, the main policy research arm of the State Council, now occupies space in the building where the main entrance of Regent Palace once stood.

In Ming dynasty, Jiajing Emperor built Wanshou Palace in this area as his main living palace in Zhongnanhai. The eponymous building took its name from Puyi's regent Zaifeng, Prince Chun who was given the land to build his palace here in 1909. The Building was not completed by the time the Qing Dynasty ended in 1911. Under the Republic of China, the building was initially the location of the Prime Minister's office and the meeting place of the Cabinet. In 1918 President Xu Shichang switched the President's residence and the Prime Minister's office, relocating his residence to Regent Palace, while the Prime Minister and Cabinet moved to Dianxu Hall in the Garden of Abundant Beneficence. When Huairen Hall became the Presidential residence in 1923, Regent Palace became the location of the army and naval department.

After 1949, the People's Republic of China again used the building as the headquarters of the Premier and State Council. Though the building was beginning to show its age at the time Premier Zhou Enlai resisted renovation efforts citing a commitment to fiscal austerity. During the massive renovation of Zhongnanhai in the late 1970s, plans were made to modernize Regent palace. However, it was found that the quality of the building was very poor, the foundations were loose and the gaps between the wooden columns were filled with broken brick. As a result, the upper hall and entrance hall were torn down and rebuilt completely.

West Flower Hall

() Located in the north west corner of Zhongnanhai, this building was constructed as the living quarters for Regent Palace. West Flower Hall served as Premier Zhou Enlai's personal residence. The building has two courtyards. The front courtyard was where Zhao would meet and dine with foreign guests, while the back courtyard included the Zhou's personal office, bedroom and meeting rooms. Unlike much of the Regent Palace area, West Flower Hall was not demolished in the 1970s. After Zhou's death, his wife Deng Yingchao lived here until 1990. In the late 1990s President Li Xiannian's widow Lin Jiamei as well her children and grandchildren moved into West Flower Hall, which came to be known as "North Courtyard Core". Lin Jiamei was reportedly still living here as late as 2014.

Premier's Office

() The modern workplace of the Premier and the Vice Premiers of the State Council was built during the large scale renovation of Regent Palace in the 1970s. Unlike the offices of CCP officials in West Building Compound, which are assigned to specific individuals and do not necessarily change if the individual changes their title or role, the offices of the Premier and Vice Premier are assigned specifically to the incumbent holders of those positions and their occupants must move out when their term ends. The Premier's office does not have a front gate and courtyard like other buildings in the former Regent Palace area, instead featuring a covered access ramp. Immediately to the south of the Premier's office building is a building that serves as the headquarters for the State Council General Office.

Fourth Conference Room 
() This building houses the State Council's fourth conference room. The fourth conference room is used for meetings between State Council officials and specially invited persons who are often not affiliated with the government. There is a large traditional Chinese gate and courtyard in front of the fourth conference room that is used for photo opportunities between State Council officials and their guests. In Regent Palace's original configuration as built by Prince Chun, the area where the fourth conference room is located was known as Yin'an Hall. The Fourth Conference Room was last rebuilt in 2003.

Ziguang Hall

Ziguang Hall, or Ziguangge or Hall of Purple Light, is a two-storey pavilion located in the northern west bank of the Central Sea. Immediately behind Ziguang Hall is another pavilion called Wucheng Hall, which connects to Zignang Hall to form a courtyard. In the Ming Dynasty, it was originally a platform built by Zhengde Emperor for military exercise. His successor Jiajing Emperor built Ziguang Hall here as a replacement for the platform. The building was rebuilt by Qing Dynasty Emperor Kangxi, who would use the location to inspect his bodyguards. During the reign of the Qianlong Emperor the building was used to display battle wall charts and seized weapons. The building was also known as the Hall of Barbarian Tributes and was used to receive tribute missions to the Emperor. After 1949 the building was occasionally used for dances. A large modern conference area was later built on the building's western side. Ziguang Hall is used today as the main reception area in Zhongnanhai for meeting with foreign diplomats and conducting talks with world leaders. Wucheng Hall is often used for photo opportunities in which a Chinese leader will be pictured sitting alongside their visiting counterpart.

The State Council Auditorium is connected to the western side of Ziguang Hall. In the early years after 1949, the State Council Auditorium was used as a movie theatre which held showings several times a week. The building was also used as a canteen for State Council staff. This auditorium was updated to its present form in 1979 and is used for ceremonies and other events where it is necessary to congregate the State Council's staff.

Tennis Court
Initial plans to build an indoor tennis court in the State Council section of Zhongnanhai were made in the late 1980s. At the time China was receiving a significant influx of new diplomatic delegations on international exchange trips. Feeling that the facilities for hosting these diplomats at Ziguang Hall at the time were inadequate, some officials proposed that a guest lounge and tennis court be built nearby. The proposal for an indoor tennis court was, at the time, vetoed by Vice Premier Tian Jiyun. In spite of this initial resistance, an outdoor tennis court was built in Zhongnanhai by the early 2000s. In 2006, the building around the tennis court was rebuilt and modernized. Immediately to the north of the tennis court is the Zhongnanhai clinic.

Indoor Pool
The indoor swimming pool was built in 1955 by the Urban Construction and Design Institute. Mao Zedong's wife Jiang Qing reportedly proposed the building's construction during Mao's absence in order to secure its approval. Mao nonetheless used the pool because it was more convenient than traveling to the pool at Tsinghua University. Mao often stayed and worked at the pool for long periods of time. In 1958, Mao met with Soviet General Secretary Nikita Khrushchev at the pool. During the time when Mao lived nearby at Poolside House, the indoor swimming pool was remodeled and enlarged under the supervision of Zhongnanhai's head engineer Tian Genggui. Today the pool is used by senior party leaders and also contains a workout area.

Poolside House 
() The Poolside House was built right next to the large indoor swimming pool, initially for practical reasons, as Mao Zedong would frequently spend much of the day either swimming in the pool or reading political and historical books and reports from government officials by the pool's side. Therefore, a reception room, a bedroom and a study with Mao's favorite books were built, thus creating the Poolside House which allowed Mao to be permanently close to the swimming pool. Eventually, among Zhongnanhai staff, the phrase "you are wanted at the swimming pool" meant that they were ordered to immediately report to Mao.

Mao permanently left the Chrysanthemum Library and moved into the Poolside House in 1966, at the beginning of the Cultural Revolution. Especially in his later years, the Poolside House would be the place for visiting foreign leaders to see Mao. This was the case for Richard Nixon and Kakuei Tanaka. After Mao's death in 1976, Zhou Enlai's wife Deng Yingchao briefly lived here during the extensive reconstruction to Regent Palace and West Flower Hall before returning to West Flower Hall after the completion of the renovation. The original outdoor swimming pool adjacent to Poolside House was built in 1933 as a public-private partnership when Zhongnanhai was a public park. Tickets were sold for Beijing citizens each year from May to August. From 1946 to the end of the Republic of China, it was difficult to operate the pool profitably due to inflation.

Yanqing House
() Yanqing House as well as several other adjoining buildings were built during the Beiyang Government around 1922. During his time as de facto ruler of the Beiyang Government, Cao Kun used Yanqing House as his workplace while living in nearby Huairen Hall. His wives and concubines lived in several of the adjoining buildings. After Cao Kun was overthrown in 1924, he was imprisoned in Yanqing House for two years. By the early 2000s, Yanqing House had been demolished and replaced by a one-story building with two courtyards. The building was sometimes referred to as Yanqingzhai.

Wan Shan Temple 
() Known in English as Thousand Benevolence Hall, Wan Shan is a Buddhist Temple located in the east coast of the Central Sea. Originally known as Chongzhi Hall, the temple was built by the Qing Dynasty Shunzi Emperor - 1644–1661. Statues of the Buddha line the hall. Behind the temple is Thousand Sage Hall, which includes a dome and seven story Pagoda.

Water Clouds Pavilion 
() Located on an island in the Central Sea, the pavilion contains a stele engraved by the Qianlong Emperor reading "Autumn Wind on the Taiye Lake". Taiye Lake is an old name for the all three of the seas.

Nanhai 
Nanhai (literally "South Sea") is the headquarters of the CCP, including the office of the General Secretary and the offices of the staff of the Central Committee General Office. South Zhongnanhai also includes the meeting places for the Politburo, Standing Committee and Secretariat.

Huairen Hall

Huairen Hall is a two-story Chinese style hall that is used by the CCP as the main meeting place for the Politburo and as an alternate meeting place Politburo Standing Committee. The building is also the meeting location of several of the CCP's leading groups such as the Financial and Economic Affairs Leading Group and the Leading Group for Comprehensively Deepening Reforms.

The building served as the daily workplace of Dowager Empress Cixi, the then de facto ruler of China, replacing the Hall of Mental Cultivation in the nearby Forbidden City. After the Boxer rebellion, Huairen Hall became the headquarters of the occupying Eight Nation Alliance's commander Alfred von Waldersee until the building was damaged in a fire. In 1902 Empress Cixi rebuilt Huairen Hall at a cost of five million taels of silver before ultimately dying here in 1908. After the founding of the Republic of China in 1911, President Yuan Shikai used the building to meet with foreign guests and to accept New Year's day greetings. After Yuan's death, it was the site of his funeral. When Cao Kun became president, he used Huairen Hall as his residence. After the end of the Beiyang Government Huairen Hall had no permanent use and was given to the Beijing City Government.

After the founding of the People's Republic of China, the first plenary session of the Chinese People's Political Consultative Conference was held in Huairen Hall in 1949. In 1953, the building was remodeled as a two-story hall in preparation for the Asia-Pacific Peace Conference by Premier Zhou Enlai. The new meeting hall was then used for first session of the National People's Congress in 1954. Huairen Hall became the auditorium of the central government, often hosting various art shows and political meetings, including Central Committee plenums before the construction of Jingxi Hotel in 1964.

Qinzheng Hall

Qinzheng Hall is the headquarters of the Secretariat of the Chinese Communist Party and the location of the office of the party's General Secretary, a title currently synonymous with the paramount leader of the country. The building also includes a conference room that serves as the main meeting place for the Politburo Standing Committee. The room that the Politburo Standing Committee meets in is referred to as the small meeting room and is located along the corridor on the northern side of Qinzheng Hall. The small meeting room is also the meeting place of the secretaries of the CPC Secretariat.

The General Secretary's personal office is located behind an office which, in the 1980s, served as workplace of the General Secretary's policy secretary. The office was occupied by Secretary Bao Tong at the time, and the position and staff associated with it have since been more formalized as the Office of the General Secretary. The policy secretary's office is, in turn, behind another office which served as a workplace for the director of the Central Committee's General Office. It is partially because the head of the General Office has a workplace in front of the office suite of the General Secretary that the director's position is referred to as the "Danei Zongguan", roughly translated as "the gatekeeper".

In addition to the General Secretary's suite, Qinzheng Hall is also the location of the office of the First Secretary of the Secretariat, who has de facto responsibility for the secretariat's day-to-day administration of the party due to the General Secretary's role of running the country. There is an encrypted hotline that runs from Qinzheng Hall to the White House in Washington, D.C. for the purpose of conducting high level talks with American leaders.

The original Qinzheng hall was built by the Kangxi Emperor as the main hall of the Zhongnanhai complex, serving as the Emperor's primary living and working space in Zhongnanhai. After the 1911 revolution, the building served as a venue for government conferences during both the Republic of China and the People's Republic of China. Qinzheng Hall served as the meeting place for the Central People's Government Committee, the interim council that governed China from 1949 until the promulgation of the 1954 Constitution. While serving as the headquarters of the Central People's Government, Qinzheng hall was the site of the 1951 Seventeen Points Agreement which established the terms under which Tibet would come under the sovereignty of the People's Republic of China. In the late 1970s, Wang Dongxing, the director of the Central Committee General Office, demolished Qinzheng hall  and spent 6.9 million yuan intended for its reconstruction to build his own private residence. Wang's removal as head of the Central Committee General Office in 1978 prevented him from completing his plan. Qinzheng hall was inaugurated as the Secretariat's headquarters in 1980.

Benevolence Hall

() This former building was a two-story western style palace known as the Hall of the Calm Sea (Haiyantang) during the Qing Dynasty. Dowager Empress Cixi had the building built to entertain her female guests and also to receive foreign diplomats. After the suppression of the Boxer Rebellion, Eight Nation Alliance commander Alfred von Waldersee moved here after Yi Luang Temple was destroyed in a fire. After the founding of the Republic of China, the building was renamed the Hall of Benevolence (Jerentang), by Yuan Shikai, who continued to use it to host visitors.

After 1949, the building served as the first headquarters of the Central Military Commission (CMC) before the CMC staff relocated outside of Zhongnanhai. In 1956, the CCP Secretariat became an institution separate from the staff of the Party Chairman and required its own headquarters. The new General Secretary, Deng Xiaoping, chose Benevolence Hall to house the Secretariat. The building was finally demolished in 1964. The Secretariat offices temporarily moved to "Building C" in the West Building compound before moving to Qinzheng Hall in 1980.

West Building Compound

() This complex of buildings is named for its location in the south western corner of Zhongnanhai. The first of these buildings were built by the engineering battalion of the Central Guard Regiment in from 1949 to 1951 to house workplaces and apartments for the Central Committee General Office's staff. West Building is one of the workplaces of the Director of the Central Committee General Office, in addition to Qinzheng Hall. One of the original main buildings in this complex was simply called West Building Hall while the other buildings in the West Building Complex were designated A, B, C, D and F. Buildings C and D were originally intended to be used as accommodations for Provincial Communist Party Committee Secretaries when they were visiting Beijing for meetings. Many of the Mishus or secretarial staff assigned to support the General Office work here. As late as the 1990s, West Building Compound included a dormitory for the young workers of the Center Committee General Office.  The West Building includes a large kitchen and cafeteria for the General Office staff and a smaller eating area that doubles as a conference room for the use of senior leadership. The formal address of West Building Compound is 12 Fuyou Street, Xicheng District, Beijing.

The President's office and staff were also located in the West Building Compound during the time when the office of was not also simultaneously held by the paramount leader, such as during Liu Shaoqi's presidency from 1959 to 1967. Liu Shaoqi's office was located in Building A. Likewise, Marshal Zhu De's office was located in Building B of the West Building compound when he served as Vice President of China. In 1962, President Liu Shaoqi presided over an extraordinary, enlarged meeting of the Politburo Standing Committee in this location, known as the "West Building Meeting". At the meeting, the party leaders discussed in significant detail the dire fiscal and economic situation in the country in the aftermath of the failure of the Great Leap Forward and promised to recover the agricultural sector.

Between 2007 and 2008, part of the original West Building Compound was demolished to make way for a new three story rectangular building that was completed by 2010. The Central Committee General Office's physical office footprint has now expanded beyond Zhongnanhai to include several buildings on the other side of Fuyou Street from West Building as well as other buildings in the Xicheng District area. The gate on Fuyou Street that Central Committee staff use to travel between buildings inside and outside of the complex is called the "Great West Gate" because it has the highest regular use of Zhongnanhai's gates.

Many of the agencies directly under the supervision of the Central Committee General Office now have their formal headquarters in an annex of buildings spread out on the western side of Fuyou Street adjacent to Zhongnanhai as well as certain locations still within South Zhongnanhai. The formal addresses of these agencies are as follows:

Research Office: 8 Fuyou Street, Xicheng District, Beijing
Secretary Bureau: 1 Boxue Hutong , Xicheng District, Beijing
Bureau of Regulations: 99 Fuyou Street, Xicheng District, Beijing
Security Bureau: 81 Nanchang Street, Xicheng District, Beijing (Shuqingyuan Pavilion)
Confidential Bureau: 7 Dianchang Road, Fengtai District, Beijing
Confidential Transportation Bureau: 11 Xihuangchenggen North Street, Xicheng District, Beijing
Special Accounting Office: 14 Fuyou Street, Xicheng District, Beijing
Supervision and Inspection Office: Unknown location, Beijing
Personnel Bureau: 12 Fuyou Street, Xicheng District, Beijing (West Building Compound proper)
Office of the General Secretary: Qinzheng Hall, Xicheng District, Beijing
Veterans Bureau: 50 Dajue Hutong , Xicheng District, Beijing
Administration Bureau of Organs directly under the Central Committee: 9 Xihuangchenggen North Street, Xicheng District, Beijing

Garden of Abundant Beneficence

() Some of these buildings were built by Emperor Kangxi of the Qing Dynasty who originally used them to raise silkworms. More buildings were later added by Emperor Qianlong, who used them as libraries and as a personal retreat. Throughout this garden, there are wooden placards at the buildings’ entrances, inscribed by Emperor Qianlong. In the northwestern area of the garden is a building called Chunlianzhai which once housed the seal of Emperor Qianlong and several artworks. After the Boxer Rebellion Chunlianzhai was looted and it subsequently became a summer residence for the commander of the German contingent of the Eight Nation Alliance Army. In the early days of the People's Republic of China Chunlianzhai was used as a dance hall, where dances were held twice a week by senior party leaders.

The largest building in the Garden of Abundant Beneficence is Dianxu Hall, which was known as Chong Ya Temple during the Qianlong Emperor's reign, Yinian Temple during the Guangxu Emperor's reign and finally as Yitingnian during the Republic of China. During the Beiyang Government (1912-1928) of the Republic of China, the office of the President was initially located in Dianxu Hall. In 1918 President Xu Shichang switched the President's residence and the Prime Minister's office, relocating his residence to Regent Palace, while the Prime Minister instead moved to Dianxu Hall in the Garden of Abundant Beneficence. Dianxu Hall became a general purpose meeting area for CCP officials after 1949. During Mao Zedong's time as Paramount Leader, Politburo Meetings were often held in Dianxu Hall due its proximity to Mao's house. Before 1980 the Politburo Standing Committee also met in the one of the small conference rooms of Dianxu Hall during the times when meetings were not held in Mao's house.

The Garden of Abundant Beneficence also contains Chairman Mao Zedong's first personal residence and office, which he used from 1949 to 1966, a building called the Library of Chrysanthemum Fragrance. An air raid shelter was dug in the courtyard of Mao's residence shortly after he moved into Zhongnanhai. Mao relocated to a new building known as the Poolside House in 1966 at the start of the Cultural Revolution. After Mao's death, the Chrysanthemum Library was preserved as a museum which is not accessible to the general public. Immediately to the east of the Library of Chrysanthemum Fragrance are a series of buildings known as the West Eight Houses, which served as a dormitory for Mao's personal aides and secretaries.

Shuqingyuan Pavilion
() Located in the northeast corner of the Southern Sea, the building was built for the Qianlong Emperor as part of a small garden, similar in style to the Beihai Park. After 1959, the original building was destroyed in order to make way for the construction of a barracks and officer staff quarters for Unit 8341, the Zhongnanhai security guard regiment. The formal address of Shuqingyuan Pavilion and the surrounding complex of buildings used by Unit 8341 is 81 Nanchang Street, Xicheng District, Beijing.

Building 202
(Chinese: 202别墅) The building next to Huairen Hall was constructed in 1974 as a specially reinforced earthquake shelter. Mao Zedong was relocated here from Poolside House after the July 1976 Tangshan earthquake. Mao died in this building on September 9, 1976.

West Four Houses
() These four houses were built as part of the western wing of the Huairen Hall complex. They are also known as Qingyuntang. These buildings were acquired by the Peking Institute of Historic Research after the end of the Beiyang government. After 1949, the Propaganda Department was located here before it was eventually moved to its current headquarters on 5 West Chang'an Street. Several communist party leaders also lived in these buildings including Deng Xiaoping, Li Fuchun, Chen Yi and Tan Zhenlin. During his paramount leadership, Deng Xiaoping used his home as a meeting place for informal conferences that would include members of the Central Advisory Commission, the Politburo, the Secretariat and the party elders. It was in Deng's home that the decision was made to use force against the demonstrators during the 1989 Tiananmen Square protests and massacre.

Wanzi Gallery
() The original buildings in this area were built by the Qianlong Emperor in 1742 to celebrate his mother's 50th birthday. Though the Qing-dynasty era buildings in the area no longer exist, this narrow lane in south-western Zhongnanhai where they once stood is now lined with houses that serve as residences of party leaders. Yang Shangkun, who served as vice-chairman of the Central Military Commission, President of China, and was one of the Eight Elders of the Deng Xiaoping Era lived in one of these buildings.

Shortly after the founding of the People's Republic, Liu Shaoqi lived here before moving into the newly constructed West Building compound. He later moved to a building called Fuluju in the same area. After Liu was denounced and purged, both Wanzi Gallery and Fuluju were demolished during the Cultural Revolution. Wanzi Gallery was later reconstructed and Mao's wife Jiang Qing lived in what was then called Building No. 201 during the height of the power of the Gang of Four. This building was also known as the Spring Lotus Chamber.

Yingtai Island

() Located in the Southern Sea, the artificial island was completed by in 1421 by Ming Emperor Yongle after he relocated his capital to Beijing.  The island was given its current name by Qing Emperor Shunzhi in 1655. Yingtai Island is connected with the shore via a stone bridge. Due to the slope of the island, the northern elevation of the island's main temple is a single-story building while the south elevation is a two-story pavilion, called "Penglai Pavilion". There are two temples to the north of Hanyuan Temple, Qingyun Temple to the east and Jingxing Temple to the west. In July 1681 the Qing Emperor Kangxi held the "Yingtai hearings", on the development of a national strategy to put down civil strife. Dowager Empress Cixi imprisoned Emperor Guangxu at Hanyuan Temple on Yingtai in August 1898 after the failure of Hundred Days Reform. Emperor Guangxu was subsequently poisoned and died here in 1908.

After 1949, Yingtai was used as the site of banquets and other hospitality activities. According to some sources Jiang Zemin lived in Hanyuan Temple on Yingtai Island during his time as paramount leader.

Xinhua Gate 
() Zhongnanhai's main entrance, Xinhua Gate is located on West Chang'an Avenue. The gate was originally built by the Qianlong Emperor in 1758 as a pavilion for one of his concubines. After the 1911 Revolution, Yuan Shikai transformed the pavilion into a gate and named it "Xinhua Gate" or "New China Gate" in 1912.  The slogans "Long live the great Chinese Communist Party " and "long live invincible Mao Zedong Thought " are now on the walls on both sides of Xinhua Gate. On the door is the inscription "serve the people" in Mao Zedong's handwriting. In 1959, an underground passage was built between Xinhua Gate and the Great Hall of the People shortly before the construction of the latter was completed. This passage was intended to be used only by members of the Politburo Standing Committee at the time.

Gallery

See also

 Beidaihe District
 Diaoyutai State Guesthouse
 History of Beijing
 Imperial City, Beijing
 Beihai Park
 Summer Palace
 Old Summer Palace
 Jade Spring Hill
 Presidential Palace, Nanjing

References

Major National Historical and Cultural Sites in Beijing
Buildings and structures in Beijing
Headquarters of political parties
Official residences in China
Presidential residences
Xicheng District